6/5 may refer to:
June 5 (month-day date notation)
May 6 (day-month date notation)